Jainpur is a village located in the Ludhiana West tehsil, of Ludhiana district, Punjab.

Administration
The village is administered by a sarpanch, who is an elected representative of the village as per the constitution of India, and a panchayati raj.

Transportation  
The closest airport to the village is Sahnewal Airport.

References

Villages in Ludhiana West tehsil